The 2018–19 Campbell Fighting Camels basketball team represented Campbell University during the 2018–19 NCAA Division I men's basketball season. The Fighting Camels, led by sixth-year head coach Kevin McGeehan played their home games at Gore Arena in Buies Creek, North Carolina as members of the Big South Conference. They finished the season 20–13, 12–4 in Big South play to win a share of the regular season championship with Radford. They defeated Hampton in the quarterfinals of the Big South tournament before losing in the semifinals to Gardner–Webb. As a regular season conference champion and No. 1 seed in their conference tournament who failed to win their conference tournament, they received an automatic-bid to the National Invitation Tournament where they lost in the first round to UNC Greensboro.

Previous season
The  Fighting Camels finished the season 18–16, 10–8 in Big South play to finish in fourth place. They lost to Liberty in the quarterfinals of the Big South tournament. They were invited to the College Basketball Invitational where they defeated Miami (OH) and New Orleans before losing in the semifinals to San Francisco.

Roster

Schedule and results

|-
!colspan=9 style=| Exhibition

|-
!colspan=9 style=| Non-conference regular season

|-
!colspan=9 style=| Big South regular season

|-
!colspan=9 style=| Big South tournament

|-
!colspan=9 style=| NIT

References

Campbell Fighting Camels basketball seasons
Campbell
Camp
Camp
Campbell